Spavin is a condition in livestock. It may refer to:
 Bone spavin, a type of osteoarthritis that often causes lameness
 Bog spavin, a swelling condition that does not cause lameness, but may be produced by something that does

See also
 Alan Spavin (1942–2016), English former footballer